Blå Jungfrun, also known as  "Blåkulla", in English sometimes rendered literally as The Blue Maiden is a Swedish island in the Baltic Sea. It is situated in the Kalmar Strait, between the mainland province of Småland and the island province of Öland. Home to black guillemots and a Swedish National Park since 1926, freedom to roam at Blå Jungfrun is limited with visitors prohibited from staying overnight on the island or making fires.

The island consists partly of bare rock with the remainder covered in dense hardwood forest. There are several caves and an ancient stone labyrinth from which it is forbidden to remove stones.

Geologically the island is an ancient inselberg rising from the Sub-Cambrian peneplain. After its formation in the Precambrian, Blå Jungfrun was buried in sandstone, which protected it from any further erosion, until it was finally freed from its sandstone cover in geologically recent times. In 2014 the island became object of archeological interest when  a group of researchers discovered a cultural layer after probating the soil. At the time the authorities had given them the permission to only operate in a small area and could not take samples;  three years later they were able to recover shards made out of quartz, which date to the Stone Age and had been probably produced by a settlement of hunter-gatherers. The exact age of the site remains uncertain, but it is estimated to have existed around 8500BC, about 10,000 years ago.

Legends 

The island plays an important role in Swedish folklore, where it is viewed as an evil and magical place. The name Blå Jungfrun was originally used by sailors to avoid provoking the evil spirits who dwelt on the island. According to a widespread belief, related already by Olaus Magnus in 1555, witches meet there each Maundy Thursday. Carl Linnaeus, who visited the island in 1741, was sceptical:
 
Women and fairy-tales ... generally say that all witches will go here (truly a rather difficult journey) each Maundy Thursday; but those who have visited the place once are not likely to return, and should find out the reason for the fable: If any place in the world looks hideous, this is surely one of the most cruel.

Modern traditions

In Sweden and Swedish-speaking parts of Finland, to commemorate the travel of witches to the legendary Blåkulla (synonymous in some traditions with Blå Jungfrun), children dress as witches, old women, and old men on Easter and go door-to-door for treats similar to the trick-or-treating tradition of Halloween. The children sometimes present hand-made cards and other greetings.

Park establishment and tourism 
Between 1904 and 1925 the red granite of Blå Jungfrun was extracted in three quarries on the south of the island. It was exported chiefly to Germany as decorative stone. The destruction led to efforts to protect the island. A donation from the Swedish entrepreneur Torsten Kreuger made it possible to acquire the island and stop the quarrying. The national park was established on February5, 1926 by the Government of Sweden.

In summer, the island can be visited by tour boats from Oskarshamn or from Byxelkrok. Regular trips began in the 1950s. A park guide on Blå Jungfrun informs the visitors about the national park and its regulations. A visit to the island lasts for around 3,5 hours.

See also 
Blockula
Hagalund
Brita Zippel
Blå Jungfrun Östra lighthouse
Cunning folk

References

External links 

Sweden's National Parks: Blå Jungfrun National Park from the Swedish Environmental Protection Agency
Blå Jungfrun (National Park) - Booking and timetable information for visiting Blå Jungfrun.

Oskarshamn
Swedish islands in the Baltic
National parks of Sweden
Uninhabited islands of Sweden
Swedish folklore
Witchcraft in folklore and mythology
Protected areas established in 1926
1926 establishments in Sweden
Islands of Kalmar County
Tourist attractions in Kalmar County
Inselbergs of Europe
Witchcraft in Sweden